Catocala hariti is a moth in the family Erebidae. It is found in Uzbekistan and Tajikistan.

References

hariti
Moths described in 2002
Moths of Asia